Sir Kenneth Lewis (1 July 1916 – 2 July 1997) was a Conservative Party politician in the United Kingdom. He was Member of Parliament of the United Kingdom for Rutland and Stamford from 1959 to 1983, and following boundary changes for Stamford and Spalding from 1983 to 1987.

Life 
Son of Agnes and William Lewis, Kenneth Lewis was born and educated in Jarrow, County Durham, and attended the University of Edinburgh. He was a Labour and Personnel Executive with shipbuilders Hawthorn Leslie and Company of Hebburn, and afterwards with the County of London Electricity Supply Company. He served with the RAF during World War II as a staff officer at Allied HQ Europe, the Air Ministry, and with a Pathfinder Squadron. He started his own shipping and travel business. He married Jean Lewis in 1948, and together they had two children: Kaye Michie and Christopher Lewis. He lived in Preston, near Uppingham, Rutland.

From 1949 to 1952 he was a member of Middlesex County Council, and contested Parliamentary elections as Conservative candidate in 1945 and 1950 at Newton, and at Ashton-under-Lyne in 1951.

His Parliamentary career included Chairmanship of the Conservative Party Parliamentary Labour Committee from 1962 to 1964, and he served on the Estimates, Expenditure and Selection Committees. He was Chairman of the East Midlands Conservative Members and Candidates Committee and the Area Conservative Political Centre. Lewis was noted for his remembrance speeches.

In February 1984 he spoke in the Commons against the ban on Trades Union representation at GCHQ, urging the government to show more recognition of the needs of workers for representation, and joined former prime minister Edward Heath in abstaining on the vote.

Lewis was an active churchman, and served as chairman of a Standing Committee of the World Council of Churches. He was also deputy lieutenant of Rutland (1973).

Kenneth Lewis was knighted in 1983. Jean Lewis died in 1991, and Lewis died on 2 July 1997, aged 81.

His son Christopher Lewis was elected to Torbay Council in 2007.

References

External links 
 

1916 births
1997 deaths
Alumni of the University of Edinburgh
Royal Air Force officers
Conservative Party (UK) MPs for English constituencies
UK MPs 1959–1964
UK MPs 1964–1966
UK MPs 1966–1970
UK MPs 1970–1974
UK MPs 1974
UK MPs 1974–1979
UK MPs 1979–1983
UK MPs 1983–1987
Politicians awarded knighthoods